Animal transporters are used to transport livestock or non-livestock animals over long distances. They could be specially-modified vehicles, trailers, ships or aircraft containers. While some animal transporters like horse trailers only carry a few animals, modern ships engaged in live export can carry tens of thousands.

The Animal Transportation Association campaigns for humane transporting of animals as do many other animal welfare organisations.

See also

Animal-powered transport
Drover's caboose
Horse box
Horse trailer
livestock carrier (Maritime) 
Livestock transportation
Road transport
Stock car (rail)

References 

Road transport
Livestock transportation vehicles
Intensive farming
Animals and humans